The Segunda División B 2005–06 season was the 29th since its establishment. The first matches of the season were played on 28 August 2005, and the season ended on 28 May 2006 with the promotion play-off finals.

Group 1
Teams of Madrid, Galicia, Balearic Islands, Canary Islands and Melilla.

Scores and Classification - Group 1

Liguilla de Ascenso:
 Alcalá - Eliminated in the Second Round
 Rayo Vallecano - Eliminated in the First Round
 Real Madrid B - Promoted to the Second Division
 Universidad de Las Palmas - Eliminated in the First Round

Promoted to this group from Tercera División:
 Móstoles - Founded in: 1955//, Based in: Móstoles, Madrid//, Promoted from: Group 7
 San Isidro - Founded in: 1970//, Based in: San Isidro, Canary Islands//, Promoted from: Group 12

Relegated to this group from Segunda División:
 Pontevedra - Founded in: 1941//, Based in: Pontevedra, Galicia//, Relegated From: Segunda División

Relegated to Tercera División:
 Arteixo - Founded in: 1949//, Based in: Arteixo, Galicia//, Relegated to: Group 1
 Fuerteventura - Founded in: 2004//, Based in: Puerto del Rosario, Canary Islands//, Relegated to: Group 12
 Navalcarnero - Founded in: 1961//, Based in: Navalcarnero, Madrid//, Relegated to: Group 7
 Mallorca B - Founded in: 1983//, Based in: Palma de Mallorca, Balearic Islands//, Relegated to: Group 11

Teams

League table

Results

Top goalscorers

Top goalkeepers

Group 2
Teams of Basque Country, Castile and León, Cantabria and Asturias.

Scores and Classification - Group 2

Liguilla de Ascenso:
 Zamora - Eliminated on Second Eliminatory
 Ponferradina - Eliminated on First Eliminatory
 Burgos - Eliminated on First Eliminatory
 Real Unión - Eliminated on Second Eliminatory

Promoted to this group from Tercera División:
 Oviedo - Founded in: 1926//, Based in: Oviedo, Asturias//, Promoted from: Group 2
 Real Valladolid B - Founded in: 1944//, Based in: Valladolid, Castile and León//, Promoted from: Group 8
 Portugalete - Founded in: 1944//, Based in: Portugalete, Basque Country //, Promoted from: Group 4
 Durango - Founded in: 1919//, Based in: Durango, Basque Country//, Promoted from: Group 4
 Zalla - Founded in: 1925//, Based in: Zalla, Basque Country//, Promoted from: Group 4
 Racing Santander B - Founded in: 1926//, Based in: Santander, Cantabria//, Promoted from: Group 3

Relegated to this group from Segunda División:
 Salamanca - Founded in: 1923//, Based in: Salamanca, Castile and León//, Relegated from: Segunda División

Relegated to Tercera División:
 Mirandes - Founded in: 1927//, Based in: Miranda de Ebro, Castile and León//, Relegated to: Group 8
 Guijuelo - Founded in: 1974//, Based in: Guijuelo, Castile and León//, Relegated to: Group 8
 Sestao - Founded in: 1996//, Based in: Sestao, Basque Country//, Relegated to: Group 4
 Gimnástica - Founded in: 1907//, Based in: Torrelavega, Cantabria//, Relegated to: Group 3
 Haro - Founded in: 1914//, Based in: Haro, La Rioja//, Relegated to: Group 16

Teams

League table

Results

Top goalscorers

Top goalkeepers

Group 3
Teams of Catalonia, Navarre, Valencian Community and Aragon.

Scores and Classification - Group 3

Liguilla de Ascenso:
 Alicante - Eliminated on First Eliminatory
 Hércules - Promoted to Second Division
 Zaragoza B - Eliminated on First Eliminatory
 Castellón - Promoted to Second Division

Promoted to this group from Tercera División:
 Sant Andreu - Founded in: 1907//, Based in: Barcelona, Catalonia//, Promoted from: Group 5
 L'Hospitalet - Founded in: 1957//, Based in: L'Hospitalet de Llobregat, Catalonia//, Promoted from: Group 5
 Reus - Founded in: 1909//, Based in: Reus, Catalonia //, Promoted from: Group 5

Relegated to this group from Segunda División:
 Terrassa - Founded in: 1906//, Based in: Terrassa, Catalonia//, Relegated From: Segunda División

Relegated to Tercera División:
 Peña Sport - Founded in: 1925//, Based in: Tafalla, Navarre//, Relegated to: Group 15
 Novelda - Founded in: 1925//, Based in: Novelda, Valencian Community//, Relegated to: Group 6
 RCD Espanyol B - Founded in: 1994//, Based in: Barcelona, Catalonia//, Relegated to: Group 5
 Girona - Founded in: 1929//, Based in: Girona, Catalonia//, Relegated to: Group 5

Teams

League table

Results

Top goalscorers

Top goalkeepers

Group 4
Teams of Andalusia, Extremadura, Castile La Mancha, Ceuta and Murcia.

Scores and Classification - Group 4

Liguilla de Ascenso:
 Sevilla B - Eliminated on First Eliminatory
 Conquense - Eliminated in Second Eliminatory
 Ceuta - Eliminated on First Eliminatory
 Lorca - Promoted to Second Division

Promoted to this group from Tercera División:
 Baza - Founded in: 1970//, Based in: Baza, Andalusia//, Promoted from: Group 9
 Villanueva - Founded in: 1951//, Based in: Villanueva de Córdoba, Andalusia//, Promoted from: Group 10
 Mérida - Founded in: 1990//, Based in: Mérida, Extremadura //, Promoted from: Group 14
 Águilas - Founded in: 1925//, Based in: Aguilas, Murcia //, Promoted from: Group 13
 Almansa - Founded in: 1992//, Based in: Almansa, Castile La Mancha //, Promoted from: Group 18

Relegated to this group from Segunda División:
 Córdoba - Founded in: 1954//, Based in: Córdoba, Andalusia//, Relegated From: Second Division

Relegated to Tercera División:
 Arenas - Founded in: 1931//, Based in: Armilla, Andalusia//, Relegated to: Group IX
 Don Benito - Founded in: 1928//, Based in: Don Benito, Extremadura//, Relegated to: Group XIV
 Jerez - Founded in: 1969//, Based in: Jerez de los Caballeros, Extremadura//, Relegated to: Group XIV
 Tomelloso - Founded in: 1979//, Based in: Tomelloso, Castile La Mancha//, Relegated to: Group XVII

Teams

League table

Results

Top goalscorers

Top goalkeepers

 
Segunda División B seasons

3
Spain